Banisteriopsis is a genus of flowering plants in the family Malpighiaceae. There are about 92 species. Most are native to Brazil, Bolivia, Colombia, Ecuador, and Peru.

One well-known species is Banisteriopsis caapi, the source of ayahuasca.

Selected species
Species include:
 Banisteriopsis acapulcencis
 Banisteriopsis basifixa
 Banisteriopsis calcicola
 Banisteriopsis caapi
 Banisteriopsis dugandii
 Banisteriopsis elegans 
 Banisteriopsis ferruginea
 Banisteriopsis grandifolia
 Banisteriopsis harleyi
 Banisteriopsis irwinii
 Banisteriopsis krukoffii
 Banisteriopsis lucida
 Banisteriopsis metallicolor
 Banisteriopsis muricata
 Banisteriopsis nummifera
 Banisteriopsis pulchra
 Banisteriopsis quitensis
 Banisteriopsis stellaris
 Banisteriopsis valvata
 Banisteriopsis williamsii

Legal status

United States

Louisiana
Except for ornamental purposes, growing, selling or possessing Banisteriopsis spp. is prohibited by Louisiana State Act 159.

References

Malpighiaceae
Malpighiaceae genera
Taxa named by Charles Budd Robinson
Taxa named by John Kunkel Small